The Nikon F80 (or N80 as it is known in the U.S.) is an SLR prosumer camera manufactured by Nikon, released in January 2000.

History
The F80 was introduced on January 27, 2000, to the worldwide consumer market. It was the successor to the F70 and was based on the highly successful F100 with the notable lack of the weatherproofing and ruggedness that characterizes that camera.

Three versions of the F80 are available, the F80, the F80D which has a different back that can imprint date information on the frame and the F80S which can also imprint exposure data between frames in addition to the date information. Using the exposure data imprint function will slow the F80 varying on film speed and temperature.

Design and construction
The F80 keeps with the traditional look of Nikon camera bodies, with a black plastic exterior, white Nikon lettering on the prism with a red rubber insert on the inside of the camera's grip.

The F80 accepts all F-mount Nikkor lenses with the exception of many pre AI, and all IX, lenses (these cannot be mounted on the F80 without causing damage).  Older non-CPU AI and AIS lenses can be mounted on the camera, but exposure must be set manually as the camera will not meter through them at all.

The F80 was the first Nikon camera to feature on-demand grid lines.

The F80 was chosen by Nikon to be the basis for the popular Nikon D100 digital SLR. The chassis was also used by Fujifilm as the basis for the FinePix S2 Pro and S3 Pro, and by Eastman Kodak for the Kodak DCS Pro 14n and DCS Pro SLR/n.

Rumors were abound during 2005 that Nikon would make a successor to the F80, and discontinue most other film cameras apart from the F6 and the F80 replacement. Early in 2006 Nikon announced that they intend to drop production of all film cameras apart from the F6 and FM10. Regardless of whether Nikon had actually developed (or even planned) a successor for the F80, it never appeared on the market.

References

External links

 Nikon F80 Datasheet in PDF Format
 Nikon Digital Archive on Film SLR camera's

F080
F080